Notoscopelus is a genus of lanternfishes.

Species
There are currently six recognized species in this genus:
 Notoscopelus bolini B. G. Nafpaktitis, 1975
 Notoscopelus caudispinosus (J. Y. Johnson, 1863) (Spinetail lanternfish)
 Notoscopelus elongatus (O. G. Costa, 1844)
 Notoscopelus japonicus (S. Tanaka (I), 1908) (Japanese lanternfish)
 Notoscopelus kroyeri (Malm, 1861) (Lancet fish)
 Notoscopelus resplendens (J. Richardson, 1845) (Patchwork lampfish)

References

Myctophidae
Marine fish genera
Taxa named by Albert Günther